Matsya was a Vedic kingdom and later became a part of sixteen Mahajanapadas, which also appears in Hindu Epic literature. The capital of Matsya was at Viratanagari (present-day Bairat, in Rajasthan) which is said to have been named after its founder king, Virata.

Mention in Mahabharata
Matsya kingdom was founded by king Matsya who was the twin brother of Satyavati and who was contemporary to Bhishma.

The Mahabharata (V.74.16) refers to a King Sahaja, who ruled over both the Chedis and the Matsyas, which implies that Matsya once formed a part of the Chedi Kingdom.

References 

Kingdoms in the Mahabharata